Vojin Biljić (born 1977) is a Serbian politician. He served in the National Assembly of Serbia from 2019 to 2020 as a member of the Enough is Enough (Dosta je bilo, DJB) political movement.

Early life and private career
Biljić was born in Užice, in what was then the Socialist Republic of Serbia in the Socialist Federal Republic of Yugoslavia. He graduated from the University of Belgrade Faculty of Law in 2002 and in higher specialist studies in European Union law at Nancy 2 University in France in 2003. Biljić passed the bar exam in 2005 and began a private law practice in the same year, specializing in European law.

He received the rank of reserve second lieutenant in the Armed Forces of Serbia and Montenegro in 2005.

Politician
Biljić joined DJB in the mid-2010s, at a time when the movement was considered liberal and reformist. He was given the twenty-first position on the DJB electoral list in the 2016 Serbian parliamentary election; the list won sixteen mandates, and he was not immediately elected. He also received the fifth position on the movement's list for Vračar in the concurrent 2016 Serbian local elections and was elected when the list won seven mandates. He served in the municipal assembly for the four-year term that followed.

Biljić appeared in the lead position on a coalition election list of DJB and the hard-right Dveri party in the 2018 Belgrade City Assembly election. During the campaign, he said that DJB and Dveri had profoundly different ideologies but defended the coalition as necessary to fight corruption in the country. He also argued for reducing the price of public transportation and providing free textbooks and kindergarten courses. The DJB–Dveri list did not cross the electoral threshold to win representation in the city assembly. DJB itself shifted to a radical right position after the election, prompting a number of resignations. Biljić remained with the movement.

Parliamentarian
Biljić was awarded a national assembly mandate in January 2019 as a replacement for Jasmina Nikolić, who had resigned. He took his seat on 13 February and served as a member of the opposition for the remainder of the term.

The DJB movement contested the 2020 Serbian parliamentary election at the head of the Sovereignists coalition, and Biljić appeared in the third position on its list, which did not cross the electoral threshold. The coalition did not contest Vračar in the concurrent 2020 Serbian local elections, and his term in the municipal assembly came to an end.

2022 elections
Biljić appeared in the lead position on the Sovereigntists list in the 2022 Belgrade City Assembly election and the fourth position on the alliance's list in the concurrent 2022 parliamentary election. The alliance did not cross the electoral threshold at either level.

References

1977 births
Living people
Politicians from Užice
Politicians from Belgrade
Members of the National Assembly (Serbia)
Enough is Enough (party) politicians